Metaleptea adspersa is a species of short-horned grasshopper in the family Acrididae. It is found in Central and South America.

References

Further reading

External links

 

Acridinae
Orthoptera of South America
Insects described in 1834